Scenic Beach State Park is a public recreation area covering  along Hood Canal in Kitsap County,  Washington. After the area's twenty-year career as an auto camp ended in 1959, the state purchased the site in 1963, opening it as state park in 1975. The park has  of shoreline and activities that include picnicking, camping, boating, diving, fishing, and swimming.

References

External links
Scenic Beach State Park Washington State Parks and Recreation Commission
Scenic Beach State Park Map Washington State Parks and Recreation Commission

State parks of Washington (state)
Parks in Kitsap County, Washington
Protected areas established in 1963